Charles Sydney Atkin (26 February 1889 – 9 May 1958) was a British field hockey player who competed in the 1920 Summer Olympics. He was a member of the British field hockey team which won the gold medal.

References

External links
 

1889 births
1958 deaths
British male field hockey players
Olympic field hockey players of Great Britain
Field hockey players at the 1920 Summer Olympics
Olympic gold medallists for Great Britain
Olympic medalists in field hockey
Medalists at the 1920 Summer Olympics